The term gemfish can refer to different fishes in the family Gempylidae, including:
 Black gemfish (Nesiarchus nasutus)
 Silver gemfish (Rexea solandri)